The Poltava Museum of Long-Range and Strategic Aviation ( – the museum of Long-Range Aviation equipment located in the city of Poltava on the territory of the former air base "Poltava-4".

Until 2004, the 13th Guards Dnepropetrovsk-Budapest Order of Suvorov had a heavy bomber aviation division based at the air base. It consisted of 18 Tu-22M3 and 6 Tu-16.

According to the Ukrainian-American Agreement on the Elimination of Strategic Nuclear Weapons, in February 2006, at the Poltava military airfield, the last Tu-22M3 bomber Ukrainian Air Force was cut. For the museum exhibition two bombers were saved, and a few were brought from other locations.

In 2007, a museum was created on the territory of the former airbase thanks to the enthusiasm of former military pilots.

As of January 2014 and the exposition of the aviation museum includes nine aircraft, aircraft cruise missiles (KSR-2, KSR-5, Kh-22) and aerial bombs weighing from 100 to 9000 kg.

Exhibits

Gallery

Interesting facts 

 In 1994, 50th anniversary of the beginning of the 50th anniversary of the "Poltava-4" airbase took place in the territory of Operation Frantic – a joint Soviet-American military operation with shuttle flights of American Boeing B-17 Flying Fortress heavy bombers to bomb Nazi Germany and its satellite states. During the celebration, the following US Air Force aircraft were presented: ll Douglas KC-10A Extender, Boeing B-52H Stratofortress and B-1B Lancer.
 The museum and airbase were one of the sites of the book Georgy Savitsky "Field of battle – Ukraine. Broken Trident "(2009).

Trip to the museum, the mode of work and the cost of visiting 
The museum operates on Saturdays and Sundays from 9.00 to 17.00. Phone for excursion order: +38 (050) 5845418; +38 (067) 7717738; +38 (0532) 542686

See also 
 Ukrainian Long Range Aviation
 Ukraine State Aviation Museum
 Aviation Technical Museum (Lugansk)
 Military Historical Museum of Ukrainian Air Force
 Ryazan Museum of Long-Range Aviation

Notes

References

External links 

 A video excursion to the Poltava Museum of Long Range Aviation. FullHD 2015.
 }
 

Museums in Poltava Oblast
Aerospace museums in Ukraine
Ukrainian Long Range Aviation
Military and war museums in Ukraine
Open-air museums in Ukraine
Tourist attractions in Poltava